The Roman Catholic Diocese of Molegbe is a suffragan Latin diocese in the Ecclesiastical province of Mbandaka-Bikoro in the Democratic Republic of the Congo.

Its cathedral episcopal see is Cathédrale Saint-Antoine-de-Padoue (St. Anthony of Padua) in the city of Molegbe.

History 
 Established on April 7, 1911 as Apostolic Prefecture of Belgian Ubanghi, on territory split off from the then Apostolic Vicariate of Léopoldville
 January 28, 1935: Promoted as Apostolic Vicariate of Belgian Ubanghi, since entitled to a titular bishop 
 Promoted on November 10, 1959 as Diocese of Molegbe, ceasing to be exempt.

Ordinaries 
(all Roman Rite, mostly missionary members of Latin congregations)

 Apostolic Prefects of Belgian Ubanghi 
 Fr. Fulgenzio da Gerard-Montes, Capuchin Friars (O.F.M. Cap.) (1911 – 1930?)
 Fr. Basilio Ottavio Tanghe, O.F.M. Cap. (1931.10.16 – 1935.01.28 see below)

 Apostolic Vicars of Belgian Ubanghi  
 Basilio Ottavio Tanghe, O.F.M. Cap. (see above 1935.01.28 – 1947.12.16), Titular Bishop of Tigava (1935.01.28 – 1947.12.16) 
 Jean Ghislain Delcuve, O.F.M. Cap. (1948.06.10 – 1958.11.13), Titular Bishop of Bargylia
 Léon Théobald Delaere, O.F.M. Cap. (1958.11.13 – 1959.11.10 see below), Titular Bishop of Fessei (1958.11.13 – 1959.11.10)

 Bishops of Molegbe 
 Léon Théobald Delaere, (O.F.M. Cap.) (see above 1959.11.10 – 1967.08.03), later Titular Bishop of Rusibisir (1967.08.03 – 1976.09.14)
 Apostolic Administrator Louis Nganga a Ndzando (1967 – 1968.09.05)'', Bishop of Lisala (Congo-Kinshasa) (1964.11.25 – 1997.07.06)
 Joseph Kesenge Wandangakongu (1968.09.05 – 1997.10.18) 
 Ignace Matondo Kwa Nzambi, Scheutists (C.I.C.M.) (1998.06.27 – 2007.05.23)
 Dominique Bulamatari (2009.11.24 - )

See also 
 Roman Catholicism in the Democratic Republic of the Congo

Source and External links 
 GCatholic.org, with incumbent biography links
 Catholic Hierarchy

Roman Catholic dioceses in the Democratic Republic of the Congo
Christian organizations established in 1911
Roman Catholic dioceses and prelatures established in the 20th century
Roman Catholic Ecclesiastical Province of Mbandaka-Bikoro